The Enchanted April is a 1922 novel by British writer Elizabeth von Arnim.  The work was inspired by a month-long holiday to the Italian Riviera, probably the most widely read (as an English and American best seller in 1923) and perhaps the lightest and most ebullient of her novels.

Von Arnim wrote and set the book in the 15th century Castello Brown.  Critic Terence de Vere White credited The Enchanted April with making the Italian resort of Portofino fashionable.

Plot
The novel follows four dissimilar women in the 1920s England who leave their rainy, grey environments to go on holiday in Italy. Mrs. Arbuthnot and Mrs. Wilkins, who belong to the same ladies' club but have never spoken, become acquainted after reading a newspaper advertisement for a small medieval castle on the Mediterranean to be let furnished for the month of April. They find some common ground in that both are struggling to make the best of unhappy marriages.  They also reluctantly take on the waspish, elderly Mrs. Fisher and the stunning but aloof Lady Caroline Dester to defray expenses. The very genuine and open Lotty Wilkins, often muddled and awkward in her speech, has been married only a few years, but she and her husband are rubbing each other the wrong way; as the novel progresses, her intuition into her new friends' feelings and needs plays a major role. Rose Arbuthnot is a highly religious lady who does extensive charity work but is married to an author of racy popular novels who neglects her, partly because of her persistent disapproval of his work. Lady Caroline Dester is a beautiful socialite who is tired of the burden of London society and is beginning to regard her life as shallow and empty after a man she loved died in WWI. Mrs. Fisher is a pompous, snobbish, highly proper lady who knew many Victorian luminaries and regards herself as the hostess and in control of the holiday; she prefers to live in her memories of times past rather than embracing the present and is emotionally closed-off. The four women experience interpersonal tensions but eventually come together at the castle and find rejuvenation in the tranquil beauty of their surroundings, rediscovering hope and love.

Characters
Lotty Wilkins – a young housewife in her 20s who is involved in a miserable marriage with her stingy lawyer husband
Rose Arbuthnot – an extremely pious housewife whose husband writes books she does not approve of
Lady Caroline "Scrap" Dester – a 28 year old socialite who is such a beauty that she enchants everyone she meets
Mrs. Fisher – an elderly woman who still clings to her youthful years in the Victorian age
Mellersh Wilkins – Lotty's husband who is an ambitious striving penny pincher
Thomas Briggs – the young owner of the castle who is infatuated with Rose
Frederick Arbuthnot – Rose's husband, an author of memoirs of the mistresses of kings

Adaptations  
The Enchanted April has regularly been adapted for the stage and screen:

 as a Broadway play in 1925
 a 1935 American feature film
 an Academy Award-nominated feature film in 1991 (starring Josie Lawrence, Miranda Richardson, Polly Walker, Jim Broadbent and Joan Plowright)
 a Tony Award-nominated Broadway stage play in 2003
 a musical play in 2010 by Charles Leipart and Richard Bunger Evans that premiered in Pleasanton, California April 2016
 in 2015 a serial on BBC Radio 4

References

Quotations 

...she decided
pro tem, as the vicar said at meetings, to put her under the heading
Nerves. It was just possible that she ought to go straight into the
category Hysteria, which was often only the antechamber to Lunacy, but
Mrs. Arbuthnot had learned not to hurry people into their final
categories, having on more than one occasion discovered with dismay
that she had made a mistake; and how difficult it had been to get them
out again, and how crushed she had been with the most terrible remorse.

For Mrs. Arbuthnot, who had no money of her own, was obliged to live on
the proceeds of Frederick's activities, and her very nest-egg was the
fruit, posthumously ripened, of ancient sin. The way Frederick made his
living was one of the standing distresses of her life. He wrote
immensely popular memoirs, regularly, every year, of the mistresses of
kings. There were in history numerous kings who had had mistresses, and
there were still more numerous mistresses who had had kings; so that he
had been able to publish a book of memoirs during each year of his
married life, and even so there were greater further piles of these
ladies waiting to be dealt with. Mrs. Arbuthnot was helpless. Whether
she liked it or not, she was obliged to live on the proceeds. He gave
her a dreadful sofa once, after the success of his Du Barri memoir,
with swollen cushions and soft, receptive lap, and it seemed to her a
miserable thing that there, in her very home, should flaunt this
re-incarnation of a dead old French sinner.

External links 
 
 

1922 British novels
British novels adapted into films
Novels by Elizabeth von Arnim